Bates Motel is a 1987 American made-for-television supernatural horror film and a spin-off of the Psycho franchise written and directed by Richard Rothstein, starring Bud Cort, Lori Petty, Moses Gunn, Gregg Henry, Jason Bateman, and Kerrie Keane. Outside of the 1998 remake, this is the only installment not to feature Anthony Perkins as Norman Bates as Kurt Paul portrays the character. The film premiered as part of NBC Monday Night at the Movies on July 5, 1987. It is a direct sequel to Psycho, ignoring the other sequels.

The film is about Alex West, a mentally disturbed youth who was admitted to an asylum after killing his abusive stepfather. There he befriends Norman and ends up inheriting the Bates Motel. It was originally produced as a pilot for a proposed TV series set in the Bates Motel, but it was not picked up by the network.

Plot
Bates Motel ignores the existence of Psycho II and III (and would in turn be ignored by Psycho IV), with Norman Bates never being released from the mental institution to allow the events of those films. Alex West (Bud Cort) is a mentally disturbed youth who was admitted to the asylum nearly twenty years ago for killing his abusive stepfather. He became close friends with Norman Bates (Kurt Paul) at the asylum. 

Years later, Norman dies and Alex learns that he has inherited the Bates Motel. He travels to Norman's California hometown (renamed Fairville for this film; in the original film it was Fairvale) and with a little help from teenage runaway Willie (Lori Petty) and local handyman Henry Watson (Moses Gunn), Alex struggles to re-open the motel for business. Alex gets a loan to renovate the motel, but the project is plagued with rumors about the place being haunted by the ghost of Norman's mother, Mrs. Bates, and the discovery of her remains, as well as those of her late husband, buried on the grounds of the motel. When recovering the remains of Mrs. Bates, the sheriff said that the body "was never found", which seems to conflict with the original Psycho, where Mrs. Bates' corpse is present in the basement where Norman is finally captured by Sam Loomis.

While renovating the motel, Alex sees Mrs. Bates in her bedroom window, and sees the corpse of her late husband from the same window, supporting the idea that the property is haunted. After Alex tells Willie that he owes his first loan payment of $10,000 the day after the motel opens, Willie becomes suspicious and with the help of Henry reveals that the haunting was a prank and the ghost was the bank manager, Tom Fuller (Gregg Henry). Fuller had approved a loan with predatory terms with Alex and was trying to sabotage the motel by trying to scare him away. Tom is then forced to help Alex and the others by negotiating friendlier payment terms for the loan or face prison for fraud. The motel is soon finished with the renovation.

Meanwhile, not all ghost stories turn out to be hoaxes as Barbara Peters (Kerrie Keane) books a room in Alex's motel for the night, planning suicide because she was getting older, and had been through three divorces without children. Barbara meets a teenage girl, Sally (Khrystyne Haje), who invites Barbara to dance at an after prom party in the motel with her and her teenage friends, including Tony Scotti (Jason Bateman), though Barbara felt uncomfortable hanging with young kids. It is then revealed that Barbara's real name is also Sally, and that the teenage girl who took her own life 25 years ago is a ghost along with Tony, and other teens who also committed suicide. She tells “Barbara” that she has a life worth living for, then leaves with the rest of the group. “Barbara” leaves the motel the next day, planning to live her life to the fullest.

Alex looks at the screen telling viewers: "If you ever need a room, come on by. I can't say for sure what you'll find, but that is what makes the world go around".

Cast

Home media
The film was released to DVD on October 3, 2013 as part of Universal's "Vault Series", exclusively on Amazon.com.

Universal re-released the film on DVD (along with Psycho II, Psycho III and Psycho IV: The Beginning) as part of its "4-Movie Midnight Marathon Pack" in September 2014.

See also

 List of American films of 1987
 List of horror films of 1987

References

External links
 
 

1987 films
1987 television films
1987 horror films
1980s supernatural horror films
American horror television films
American supernatural horror films
Psycho (franchise) films
American ghost films
Films set in motels
Film spin-offs
Television films as pilots
Television pilots not picked up as a series
Universal Pictures films
Films produced by George Linder
1980s English-language films
NBC network original films
1980s American films
Alternative sequel films